Stanford Research may refer to:
 Stanford Research Institute or SRI International, a nonprofit scientific research institute and organization headquartered in Menlo Park, California,
 Stanford Research Systems, a maker of general test and measurement instruments located at Sunnyvale, California.

See also
 Stanford University
 Stanford (disambiguation)